Marvin Fritz (born 20 April 1993) is a German motorcycle racer. He competes in the Endurance FIM World Championship aboard a Yamaha YZF-R1. He won the 2005 ADAC Junior Cup, the 2014 IDM Supersport Championship aboard a Yamaha YZF-R6 and the 2016 IDM Superbike Championship aboard a Yamaha YZF-R1.

Fritz debuted in World superbikes at Most during August 2021, where the YART team had previously tested, finishing the season with six points.

Career statistics

Grand Prix motorcycle racing

By season

Races by year

Superbike World Championship

Races by year

(key) (Races in bold indicate pole position) (Races in italics indicate fastest lap)

* Season still in progress.

References

External links
 Profile on MotoGP.com
 Profile on WorldSBK.com
 Team Website

1993 births
German motorcycle racers
Living people
125cc World Championship riders
Superbike World Championship riders